Toporu is a commune located in Giurgiu County, Muntenia, Romania. It is composed of two villages, Tomulești and Toporu.

Natives
 Dinu Adameșteanu
 Andrei Speriatu

References

Communes in Giurgiu County
Localities in Muntenia